Dream Keyboard is a Sinhala virtual keyboard app originally developed by Dream Keyboard for Android devices. It was first released for Android in October 2020. It was later developed into the Huawei App Gallery. It is an application that can type Sinhala language into the popular Singlish method which is popular among Sri Lankans.

Sinhala is one of the least used languages in the world and many keyboard applications in the world do not show it.

References

External links
 Official Website

Information technology companies of Sri Lanka
Computer keyboard types
Pointing-device text input
Touch user interfaces